Hornbækbukta is a bay at the southeastern side of the Norwegian island of Jan Mayen. It has a width of 2.2 kilometers, and extends from the headland of Fugleodden to the southwest, to Kapp Wien to the northeast. The bay is named after hydrographer Helge Hornbæk.

References

Landforms of Jan Mayen
Bays of Norway